The 2017–18 European Rugby Continental Shield is a rugby union competition, organised by European Professional Club Rugby, Rugby Europe and the Federazione Italiana Rugby, for entry into the European Rugby Challenge Cup.

Format

The format of the Qualifying Competition remains similar to the previous season. As before, two places in the next year's Challenge Cup will be available for teams in the Continental Shield. Clubs from six countries will compete in the 2017/18 Continental Shield.

Four representatives from the Italian Eccellenza – Pataro Rugby Calvisano, Femi-CZ Rugby Rovigo, Rugby Petrarca and Rugby Viadana – will be joined by Romania's Timișoara Saracens, RC Batumi from Georgia, Heidelberger RK of Germany and Portugal's Centro Desportivo Universitario de Lisboa (CDUL Rugby) competing in two pools of four.

Following the pool stage matches, the winner of Pool A will play the runner-up in Pool B, and the winner of Pool B will play the runner-up in Pool A on a home and away basis.

The two clubs which advance will then play each other home and away with the winner securing a place in the Continental Shield final in Bilbao next May and also qualifying for the 2018/19 Challenge Cup.

The other Continental Shield finalist will be decided by a home and away play-off between Russia's Enisei-STM and Krasny Yar who have both received a bye into the knockout stage of the competition due to their participation in this season's Challenge Cup and to their success in last season's Continental Shield.

The winner of the Enisei-STM v Krasny Yar play-offs will go through to the Continental Shield final in Bilbao and will also qualify for the 2018/19 Challenge Cup.

The aim of the Continental Shield is to widen the footprint of club rugby across Europe and to give both emerging and established clubs in different territories the opportunity to qualify for the Challenge Cup.

Fixtures

Pool play-offs 

Timișoara Saracens won 32–18 on aggregate.

Heidelberger RK won 51–42 on aggregate.

Qualifying play-offs 

Enisey-STM won 74–48 on aggregate.

Heidelberger RK won 47–41 on aggregate.

Continental Shield Final

References

2017–18 rugby union tournaments for clubs
2017–18 in European rugby union